Olmos y Robles (Olmos and Robles) is a Spanish police procedural comedy television series produced by 100 Balas for Televisión Española (TVE). It premiered on September 8, 2015 on TVE's main channel La 1. The series focuses on two civil guards of very different backgrounds who have to work together solving relevant crimes.

The series was renewed for a second season, but not for a third one.

Plot
Olmos is a corporal of the Civil Guard's Public Order and Prevention service who works in the station of his birthplace, Ezcaray, a small peaceful town in La Rioja. Robles is a lieutenant of the Rapid Reaction Group, one of the most prestigious units of the Civil Guard, an urban and modern officer. They see themselves forced to work together if they want to solve the international case which, as luck would have it, has united them in this town in La Rioja, the serial murder of a group of mercenaries. They are polar opposites, but together they make up a great team.

In season 2, both guards have to work together in order to solve another important crime, which includes the death of Robles' parents, the assassination attempt of a Spanish high-ranked NATO politician and an international corruption plot related to an important arms trade enterprise.

Production
Filming of the series began in July 2015. Indoor scenes were filmed in studio in Madrid. Outdoor scenes were filmed on location in Ezcaray and other locations in La Rioja: Logroño, Haro, San Millán de la Cogolla, Nájera and Zaldierna.

Cast and characters
The following is the cast of the series:

Main characters 
Pepe Viyuela as Cp. Sebastián Olmos
Rubén Cortada as Lt. Agustín Robles
Enrique Villén as agent Gregorio Atiza
Ana Morgade as Catalina "Cata"
Asunción Balaguer as Doña Domitilla "Domi" (Olmos' grandmother)
 as Damián Navarro, the mayor of Ezcaray
Pilar Castro as Isabel "Isa" Antúnez
Luis Miguel Seguí as César Alcides
 as Lucas "Lucky" Mellado
Andrea Duro as Nuria Atiza

Recurring characters 
Antonio Tato as Claudio
Ricardo Lacámara as Braulio
Sara Sálamo as Doctora Aguilar
Kimberley Tell as Preston

List of episodes

Season 1

Season 2

References 

2015 Spanish television series debuts
2016 Spanish television series endings
2010s Spanish comedy television series
Spanish police procedural television series
Thriller television series
La 1 (Spanish TV channel) network series
Television shows set in La Rioja (Spain)
Spanish crime comedy television series